Blur 21 is a CD, DVD and vinyl box set encompassing the vast majority of music by Blur. It was released on 30 July 2012, commemorating the 21st anniversary of the release of Leisure, the band's first album. The release took place before the band's performance at Hyde Park as part of the 2012 Summer Olympics closing ceremony. One version of the box-set consists of eighteen CDs, three DVDs, one vinyl 7" record (of the early Seymour track "Superman") and a hardcover book acting as a complete biography of the band. The CDs contain all seven Blur albums, with the first five remastered, with each album receiving a new second disc of B-side material; as well as four 'rarities' discs containing mostly previously unreleased material. The DVDs contain Showtime, The Singles Night and an all-new rarities disc. It is the band's most retrospective release.

Another boxset, Blur 21 Vinyl Edition, was released at the same time, featuring the band's seven studio albums on heavyweight vinyl, each of the LPs repackaged as a double album except for Leisure, a single album. The vinyl edition does not, however, include any previously unreleased material. As above, the Blur 21 CD/DVD/7" single pack contains many previously unreleased recordings, including the long-awaited releases of previously known about songs like "Pap Pop," "Beached Whale" and "Sir Elton John's Cock."

Yet some previously released songs by the band have not been listed as featuring on the box set, such as "Colours," a Think Tank outtake released as a fan club single in 2003. Likewise, some unreleased songs are not featured on the box set, like "Death Metal," a jam session from the 13 sessions in 1998, and "For Old Time's Sake," recorded in 1993 for The Sunday Sunday Popular Community Song CD, but left off the EP, due to it possibly being deleted or lost. Also missing from The Sunday Sunday Popular Community Song CD are the b-sides "Dizzy", "Fried", "Shimmer", "Long Legged" and "Tell Me, Tell Me". Additionally, no material from the band's 1998 live recording and remix album Bustin' + Dronin' appears on the box set. Rarities 4, one of the bonus albums in the box set, features an early mix of "Under the Westway" with some differences between it and the 2012 single version. They also neglected to include instrumental versions of "Under the Westway" and "The Puritan", which were available on the CD when the single was released.

The box set also includes a special code to download all the music content as MP3, along with all the Blurb magazine issues and extra content with audio commentary and unreleased footage per album.

Reception

Blur 21 received positive reviews. On Metacritic, it has a score of 92 out of 100, based on 17 reviews. Stephen Thomas Erlewine of AllMusic wrote, "There were plenty of other great British bands of the '90s but none of their peers – Oasis, Suede, Pulp, Radiohead – covered as much stylistic ground or wound up with a catalog as rich as this ridiculously generous box set handily proves."

Track listing

References

Blur (band) albums
2012 compilation albums